American singer, director and occasional actress Lana Del Rey has appeared in 54 music videos, one documentary film, six short films (five musical), seven magazine films, and three commercials, as well as directing a bulk of her work. Del Rey's first appearance was in the short film Poolside (2010) as Lisa, a rich girl who spends her days smoking cigarettes by the pool. She received top billing for the project. Del Rey then went on to write the treatment for two music films, Ride (2012) and Tropico (2013), which were directed by Anthony Mandler. In 2015, Del Rey served as the executive producer of the film Hi, How Are You Daniel Johnston?. She then made appearances as a performer in Tower of Song: A Memorial Tribute to Leonard Cohen and in The King as herself.

Del Rey has also gained notability as a director. After directing and editing many of the music videos for her first album, Lana Del Ray, she broke into mainstream success with the songs and music videos for "Video Games", and "Blue Jeans" in 2011. Since then, she has directed more music videos, as well as the short film Freak (2016), which she also wrote, and starred as Pamela Courson, alongside Father John Misty, who played her lover, the Doors lead singer, Jim Morrison.

Music videos

As a lead artist

Guest appearances

Filmography

As lead performer

As executive producer

Magazine films

Television

Web interviews

Commercials

Notes

References 

Videographies of American artists
Videographies